Oggy and the Cockroaches: The Movie is a 2013 French animated anthology comedy film directed and written by Olivier Jean-Marie, that premiered in France on August 7, 2013, to May 20-7. The film is based on the series Oggy and the Cockroaches, a silent slapstick comedy series similar to that of Hanna-Barbera's Tom and Jerry. This is the last film Olivier Jean-Marie made before his death on May 13, 2021.

The film revolves around the eponymous characters' adventures throughout four timelines, composed of self-contained stories in a chronological order. These stories also feature Jack, Bob and Olivia. The basis of the movie also became the theme of the fifth season of Oggy and the Cockroaches, which also took place in a variety of countries, like Ancient Egypt and China, within three, separately self-contained episodes.

Plot

Within opening text vaguely stating an "extremely long time ago", a blue amoeba forms in the sea of a mysterious, unevolved planet. This amoeba is revealed to be Oggy, whose appearance gets made fun of by three other amoeba – Joey, Dee Dee and Marky. Distraught, Oggy chases after the pesky trio. These amoebae then slowly evolve into cats and three cockroaches, respectively, to which Oggy ends up having to chase after them on a desert island.
The film begins, skipping through four specific eras. In the timeline "Oggy Magnon", where cats evolved into neanderthals, Oggy, Jack and Olivia have to obtain fire for the tribe's chief. However, it is revealed Oggy dislikes the idea, due to a bad childhood memory. They still have to comply and will have to travel to a volcano to achieve the chief's perfect torch.
In the medieval story "Prince Oggy II", Oggy and Jack work together to try and succeed at quests from Oggy's father, a noble figure and king, who also defeated the detested cockroach king. The two also discover forest-dwelling Olivia, who was to be assigned a princess, but later is kidnapped and held captive in a castle by the cockroaches.
In "The Incredible Jack Holmes & Oggy Watson", based on the story Sherlock Holmes, Dee Dee and Marky steal Olivia's key to Big Ben. She thus asks the detective Jack Holmes for help, with Oggy Watson helping out on their adventure as much as he can. With London's year coming to an end, hijinx ensues.
In "Oggy-Wan Kenoggy", parodying Star Wars and the film Star Wars: A New Hope, Oggy-Wan Kenoggy (with the help of Jack) traverses through space itself to hijack a ship. Tasked to stop Bob Vader from trying to destroy the world, he readies himself with his lightsaber. However, Bob has another idea; he sends out his troops, the three cockroaches. It doesn't go as they might expect.
After the fourth timeline ends with a large explosion, Bob cries at the sight of his now-destroyed ship and the eponymous characters end up falling into a vast ocean. They evolve from small amoebas to a cat and a trio of cockroaches, once more. However, an offscreen incident Oggy yowls from sends the cockroaches into laughter.

Characters

Some of the characters' voices were provided from audio recorded by Hugues Le Bars, who composed for the original series. Each timeline assigns them a different role. One of these characters, Olivia, only appears in three timelines.

Main 
Oggy - The main protagonist of the film's segments
The cockroaches - The main antagonists of the first three segments, except "Oggy-Wan Kenoggy"
Joey - The leader, who doesn't plan anything only in "Oggy-Wan Kenoggy"
Dee Dee - The glutton, more focused on fiendish plans
Marky - Mainly assists Joey

Recurring 
Jack - Oggy's cousin, who often aids him throughout the adventure
Bob - A minor antagonist in "Oggy Magnon", "Prince Oggy II", a minor character in "Jack Holmes", and the main antagonist in "Oggy-Wan Kenoggy"
Olivia - A kind-hearted cat, who is an aiding protagonist in "Oggy Magnon", "Prince Oggy II", and "Jack Holmes"

Soundtrack
The soundtrack of the film was released in August 5, 2013, composed by Vincent Artaud, who was a composer on other Xilam titles like Hubert and Takako and FloopaLoo, Where Are You?. The Paris Symphonic Orchestra helped bring the score to life, with the opening theme from Hugues Le Bars rearranged and extended by Artaud.

Release and distribution
The film was released in France on August 7, 2013. In the United Kingdom and Ireland, it was released on May 20, 2014. In India it was released on December 21, 2014, on Cartoon Network later it was also released on Sony YAY! on October 25, 2021.

Oggy and the Cockroaches: The Movie was released on DVD and Blu-ray on December 7, 2013. The film was officially released onto YouTube, free to watch, on November 11, 2019.

References

External links
 
 

2013 films
2013 3D films
2013 comedy films
2013 animated films
2013 computer-animated films
2010s French animated films
2010s children's comedy films
2010s children's animated films
French 3D films
French comedy films
French anthology films
French children's films
French computer-animated films
3D animated films
Animated adventure films
Animated comedy films
French animated fantasy films
Animated space adventure films
Animated science fiction films
Animated anthology films
Cultural depictions of Queen Victoria on film
Animated films based on animated series
Animated films about cats
Animated films about insects
Animated films about dogs
Animated films set in prehistory
Films set in the Middle Ages
Films set in London
Films set in 1899
Films set in 1900
Films set around New Year
Films set in outer space
Animated films without speech
Films produced by Marc du Pontavice
Xilam films
France 3 Cinéma films